Riverview is an unincorporated community in Quitman County, Mississippi, northeast of Marks.

References

Unincorporated communities in Quitman County, Mississippi
Unincorporated communities in Mississippi